Pro Set was a Dallas-based trading card company founded by Ludwell Denny in 1988. Denny had gained a card license that year after making and selling other NFL memorabilia in previous years. His licensing agreement with NFL Properties allowed Denny to gain access to its extensive photo library and become the first card maker officially associated with a professional sports league. Across the bottom of most of his company's cards was its designation as "The Official NFL Card", a distinction it held through 1991.

During its years in the business, Pro Set acquired licenses from several sports associations including the NFL, NHL, NASCAR and PGA Tour to produce trading cards.

In February 2021, Leaf Trading Cards CEO Brian Gray announced that the company had assumed control of the Pro Set trademark and of its intention to resurrect the brand.

History
The first year that Pro Set released a product was 1989. The year marked the beginning of the modern era for pro American Football Cards. Score (who had entered the market the year before with baseball) also released a football product. For several years, Pro Set flooded the market with its product. The company managed to produce football sets through 1993.  In 1994, Pro Set folded due to Chapter 7 bankruptcy, citing more than $800,000 in unpaid royalties to the NFL Players Association.

Pro Set made rookie cards of actual rookies (notably draft picks) and offered more color and action shots than Topps did. Pro Set claimed to have its own printing presses for its product, which could make and issue cards very quickly. For its first football card set in 1989, Pro Set released its cards in three series. The 1989 rookies were found primarily in the second series. Key rookies in the set included Troy Aikman, Barry Sanders, Derrick Thomas, and Deion Sanders. The 100 card Series II set was sold in packs, but the packs averaged 11 Series I cards and 4 Series II cards per pack. These cards not only featured first round picks but featured later round picks. These cards were labelled as Pro Set Prospects.

At its peak, Pro Set had a  headquarters, where 225 employees designed various cards. In 1992, Pro Set forecasted sales of $165 million. A free magazine was published by Pro Set called the Pro Set Gazette. It was mailed to 1.2 million collectors twice a year. Beckett Publications noted that in 1991, sports cards grossed about $1.9 billion in sales in North America, so Pro Set had a dramatic impact, albeit briefly.

Insert Cards

Football
There were a number of inserts in 1989 Pro Set football, including a 30 card subset of broadcasters. There were also Super Bowl insert cards for each game that had been played. There was also a card for NFL Commissioner Pete Rozelle. Pro Set introduced an insert card for Santa Claus that was labelled as a coach card. The first year it was released was in 1989 and it was a dealer premium. It was inserted in packs in 1990 and 1991. The Santa Claus cards included Pro Set founder Ludwell Denny somewhere in the card. On the back of each Santa card is a parody of the poem "The Night Before Christmas" that has sportscard subject matter. Pro Set included other insert cards in its 1990 offering, such as Payne Stewart, a comic book character called Super Pro, which was a superhero in a football uniform, a tribute to the late Joe Robbie, and the Lombardi Trophy Hologram card.

Error cards

Football
The 1990 Pro Set football card release has several errors and variations. Due to a contractual dispute, and his unwillingness to join the NFLPA, the Pro Bowl card of Eric Dickerson (No. 338) was withdrawn early creating a short print. Card #338 would be reissued with Ludwell Denny on the front and it was a promotional card not available in packs. Card #75 in the set was meant to be Browns Center Cody Risien, but the card was withdrawn early due to his retirement during training camp, also resulting in a short print. The most sought after variation from 1990 Pro Set is card #204 Fred Marion of the New England Patriots. This card is rather controversial because the card features San Francisco 49ers player John Taylor in the background and the belt from Taylor's pants came undone. The positioning of the belt gives the appearance that his private area is exposed, but it is just a shadow and the belt.

Other error cards and variations in the 1990 Pro Set football set include:

Various cards in the 1990 offering have three variations. They are as follows:
Card 15: Walter Stanley, the number on the back of the card is 87.
Card 134: Andre Rison, traded stripe on front, message Are You Missing Something is on the back
Card 161: Art Shell, the birthdate of 11/26/46 is on the back, small HOF print in banner on front
There were multiple Team Draft Day varieties of Jeff George. He was featured in his Illinois Fightin’ Illini uniform. One version had the Patriots logo on the front of the card. Another version was randomly inserted in packs of Series 1 football, and featured the card, but with the Indianapolis Colts logo.

Hockey

1990-91 Pro Set Hockey

1991-92 Pro Set Hockey

1991-92 Pro Set Platinum

Of note
 After the launch of football, Pro Set issued a 100-card PGA Tour set in 1990. The set included members of the Senior Tour and was issued as a complete set. This was the first time that Pro Set issued complete sets.
 Pro Set offered cards in various languages. In 1991, Pro Set featured football cards in Spanish, hockey cards in French and soccer cards in British English.
 Ludwell Denny was trying to syndicate a television show called "Profiles", an entertainment newsmagazine for memorabilia collectors. The show had a trial run in Dallas-Fort Worth and other parts of Texas.
 As part of their 1991 Series I set, Pro Set issued a card of the 1990 Heisman Trophy winner, Brigham Young University quarterback Ty Detmer. However, Detmer had won the Trophy during his junior year and returned to BYU for his senior year in 1991. This created a mild controversy as it was one of the first times an active NCAA player was featured in a card set of professional athletes.
 In 1991, Pro Set issued a card of Notre Dame star Raghib Ismail, despite the fact that he signed with the Canadian Football League's Toronto Argonauts. 1991 Pro Set's NFL Series I featured Ismail on card number 36, honoring him as the Walter Camp Player of the Year.
 In 1992, Pro Set created a 100-card set based on the Guinness Book of World Records. Each card was 3½x2½ inches. The cards were available in Canada, the United States, Australia, South Africa and Great Britain.The first card featured Cosmoclock 21 at Yokohama, Japan. Card 100 showed Mike Powell at the 1991 World Athletics Championships in Tokyo. Cards 1-43 were classified as "Facts and Feats", while cards 44-84 are "Natural & Human World", and cards 85-100 are "Sports & Games".
 After disappearing in the 1960s, the Parkhurst hockey card brand was resurrected in 1991 by Brian H. Price and licensed to Pro Set. Following the popularity of hockey cards in 1990–91, Parkhurst cards were back in the marketplace. Pro Set promoted Parkhurst as a premium brand of cards. Series I and Series II were available in both English and French and featured the rookie cards of players including Dominik Hašek and John LeClair. The 1991–92 Update Set was the final release of the year and was the most valuable of all three sets. Another key rookie card of that set was of Bill Guerin.

When Pro Set, Inc. entered Chapter 11 bankruptcy protection prior to the 1992–93 NHL season, Price traveled weekly from Toronto to Dallas and became the unofficial hockey brand manager. The second year of Parkhurst (1992–93) was the final one with Pro Set as the company went bankrupt and Price took his Parkhurst tradename and license to the Upper Deck Company, an agreement which began with the 1993–94 season.

 In August 1992, Pro Set replaced its founder Ludwell Denny at the insistence of its lenders. Denny was replaced with a San Francisco-based turnaround expert. Robert J. McLaughlin became Pro Set's chief executive officer, with the task of resolving the obligations to its lenders, licensors and trade creditors.
 In December 1994, the National Football League asked Federal authorities to investigate investments made by two former NFL Properties presidents due to their affiliation with Pro Set. The NFL's special properties committee appointed by Commissioner Paul Tagliabue and the properties executive committee requested the investigation into Pro Set. The United States Attorney for the Southern District of New York was assigned to handle the investigation.
The allegations were based on investments made by former NFL Properties presidents, John Flood, (who was dismissed in March 1994), and his predecessor, John Bello, who quit in September 1993. Neither Flood nor Bello told the league they had set up companies to invest in Pro-Set Press, a printer partly owned by the Pro Set trading card company.

List of products
1991 NHRA Winston Drag Racing

1992 NHRA Drag Racing

1991 Superstars series 1

1991 superstars series 2

1991 Yo MTV Raps Products launched by Pro Set included:

Desert Storm Pro Set (1991)
Guinness World Records cards (1992)
NASCAR Pro Set Legends (1992)
NFL Football (1989)
NFL Football (1990)
NFL Football (1991)
NFL Football Spanish (1991)
NFL Football (1992)
NHL Hockey Series 1 (1990–91)
NHL Hockey Series 2 (1990–91)
NHL Hockey Series 1 (1991–92)
NHL Hockey Series 1 French (1991–92)
NHL Hockey Series 2 (1991–92)
NHL Hockey Series 2 French (1991–92)
NHL Hockey (1992–93)
Parkhurst Hockey Series 1 (1991–92)
Parkhurst Hockey Series 1 French (1991–92)
Parkhurst Hockey Series 2 (1991–92)
Parkhurst Hockey Series 2 French (1991–92)
Parkhurst Hockey Update (1991–92)
Parkhurst Hockey (1992–93)
Parkhurst Hockey Update (1992–93)
PGA Tour (1990)
Pro Set Platinum Football Series 1 (1991)
Pro Set Platinum Football Series 2 (1992)
Pro Set Platinum Hockey Series 1 (1991–92)
Pro Set Platinum Hockey Series 2 (1991–92)
Pro Set Power Football (1992)
Pro Set Puck Candy 1991-92 
Pro Set Soccer (featuring English and Scottish soccer players) 1990-91
Pro Set Soccer (featuring English and Scottish soccer players) 1991-92
The Little Mermaid (1991)
World League of American Football 1991

References

Trading cards
Companies based in Dallas